The SnoCore Tour, occasionally typeset as Sno-Core, was an annual festival tour of the United States. It features performances by some of the most popular groups largely of the alternative rock and metal spectrum. Other than 2008 and 2016, the event has taken place every year since its inception in December 1995. SnoCore is marketed towards the winter sports culture.

History
John Boyle, Eric Lochtefeld and Rick Bonde established SnoCore as an entertainment opportunity for fans during the year's slow point in live music, the winter season. Originally began as a mini tour in December 1995 headlined by Sublime, it would also serve as an excuse for bands to perform for Western mountain resort towns and go snowboarding. SnoCore originally focused predominantly on punk and ska groups and routed through ski communities. But as it became a national tour, SnoCore aimed toward hard rock and heavy metal and engaged larger, more traditional concert venues. In late 1997, ARTISTdirect principals Marc Geiger and Don Muller, the former having also co-founded Lollapalooza, purchased the tour from Boyle. They still make a point to schedule dates in a number of resort towns despite having strayed somewhat from its original concept.

Corresponding with its name, SnoCore features large video screens playing footage of freestyle snowboarding and skiing between performances. Local shops have set up at concerts and local resorts have tied in with them. However, SnoCore does not feature sideshows as showcased at the Warped Tour and remains strictly a musical festival. The tour commonly hosts a sponsor; examples include Airwalk in 1997, Levi's in 1999, and Winterfresh in 2005.

On March 10, 1998, Foil Records released the Sno-Core Compilation which features various bands that have partaken in the festival. In 2001, SnoCore split into two tours: the funk/jam based SnoCore Icicle Ball and the hard rock/heavy metal based SnoCore Rock. This carried on once more the following year.

During the 2006 tour, stomach flu ran its course through all participating bands. Most severely affected was Seether frontman Shaun Morgan who, rather than cancel altogether, opted to perform acoustic sets for their last few shows. This alternative met with high approval from fans and influenced the group to release their first acoustic album, One Cold Night.

Saliva was scheduled to co-headline the 2009 tour but frontman Josey Scott needed more time to recover from a recent ulcer surgery. As a result, the band intended to cancel the first two weeks and substitute Scott with Walt Lafty of Silvertide beginning April 17. Ultimately, they decided in the interest of the fans to drop out entirely. This made the 2009 band lineup the leanest in SnoCore history.

Jägermeister sponsored the first Canadian SnoCore tour in 2010. The schedule ran just under two weeks and included cities such as Calgary, Edmonton, Toronto, and Vancouver.

Tour lineups

1995
Sublime
Guttermouth
Skankin' Pickle
Rhythm Collision
Safe To Face

1996
Sublime
Guttermouth
Assorted Jelly Beans
Less Than Jake
Skankin' Pickle
theLINE

1997
Face to Face
The Pharcyde
Voodoo Glow Skulls
Powerman 5000
Less Than Jake (select dates)
Orange 9mm (select dates)
Salmon (select dates)

1998
Primus
Blink-182
Long Beach Dub Allstars
The Aquabats
Tha Alkaholiks
Mephiskapheles

1999
Everclear
Soul Coughing
Redman (first-half of tour)
The Black Eyed Peas (second-half of tour)
DJ Spooky

2000
System of a Down
Incubus
Mr. Bungle
Puya

2001
Rock
Fear Factory
Kittie
Union Underground
Slaves on Dope
Boy Hits Car

Icicle Ball
Colonel Les Claypool's Fearless Flying Frog Brigade
Galactic
Lake Trout
Drums & Tuba

2002
Rock
Alien Ant Farm
Adema
Glassjaw
Earshot
The Apex Theory (Fenix*TX was originally announced for the tour but they dropped out a week before tour starts)

Icicle Ball
Karl Denson's Tiny Universe
Spearhead
Nikka Costa
Ozomatli
Blackalicious
Sector 9
Saul Williams

2003
Sparta
Glassjaw
Hot Water Music
Dredg

2004
Trapt
Smile Empty Soul
Finger Eleven
Strata

2005
Chevelle
Helmet
Crossfade
Future Leaders of the World
Strata

2006
Seether
Shinedown
Flyleaf
Halestorm

2007
Army of Anyone
Dropping Daylight
Hurt
Neurosonic

2009
Static-X
Burn Halo
The Flood
Saliva was originally scheduled to co-headline but canceled due to Josey Scott's prolonged recovery from ulcer surgery.

2010
Protest the Hero
Hawthorne Heights (dropped off in March)
Theset
Elias
Abandon All Ships (select dates)
Doll (select dates)

2014 (cancelled)
 The Pretty Reckless
 Heaven's Basement
 The Letter Black
 Crobot

2015
Flyleaf
Adelitas Way
Framing Hanley
Fit for Rivals
Romantic Rebel (select dates)
Lullwater (select dates)

References

Concert tours
Heavy metal festivals in the United States
Rock festivals in the United States
Recurring events established in 1996
Winter festivals